Francisco José Campos Lopéz (May 11, 1924 – January 28, 2006) was a Cuban-born professional baseball player, an outfielder who appeared in 71 games played over three Major League seasons with the Washington Senators between –.

Born in Havana, Campos played in organized baseball for nine seasons (1944–1945; 1948–1954). He made his debut with Washington after winning the 1951 batting championship of the Class B Tri-State League, batting .368 with 177 hits. In his debut game for the Senators on September 11, 1951, Campos doubled in his first MLB at bat off Howie Judson of the Chicago White Sox. He continued his hot streak by racking up four multi-hit games in his next seven Major League appearances, and batted .423 with 11 hits in 26 at bats during his September trial.

Campos spent the entire  campaign with Washington, appearing in 53 games. Although he played the outfield in 23 games during the season's early months, he appeared exclusively as a pinch hitter or pinch runner after July 22. Campos batted .259 in 112 at bats for the year. His Major League career concluded with ten more pinch hitting appearances during the early weeks of the 1953 season.  All told, Campos made 41 hits in the Majors, including nine doubles and two triples.

References

External links

1924 births
2006 deaths
Charleston Senators players
Charlotte Hornets (baseball) players
Chattanooga Lookouts players
Havana Cubans players
Major League Baseball outfielders
Major League Baseball players from Cuba
Cuban expatriate baseball players in the United States
Portsmouth Cubs players
Baseball players from Havana
Toronto Maple Leafs (International League) players
Washington Senators (1901–1960) players
Cuban expatriate baseball players in Canada